Stumptown is a name or nickname that has been applied to several places in the United States (listed alphabetically by state):

Guerneville, California the site of an ancient coast redwood forest, much of which was logged for the rebuilding of San Francisco after the 1906 earthquake and fire.  Prior to being renamed for one of the local milling families, Guerneville was called Stumptown for the giant redwood stumps left by the loggers. Each year Guerneville holds its "Stumptown Daze Parade" and a number of local businesses adopted the original name including Stumptown Brewery, Stumptown Nursery and Stumptown Cycles.
Whitefish, Montana was called Stumptown as the area was cleared for the train station.
Matthews, North Carolina was originally named Stumptown in the early 19th century after cotton farmers cleared the land, leaving tree stumps everywhere.
Portland, Oregon bears the nickname Stumptown, as well as several other nicknames. In the mid-19th century, the city's growth led residents to clear a lot of land quickly, but the tree stumps were not immediately removed; in some areas, there were so many that people used to jump from stump to stump to avoid the muddy, unpaved roads. The nickname is used in the names of several local businesses, including Stumptown Coffee Roasters, an independent coffee roaster and retailer located in Portland; Stumptown Sewing, a custom sewing and upholstery shop; StumpTown Kilts, a maker of men's and women's modern kilts; Stumptown (comics), a creator-owned detective fiction comic book series by Greg Rucka, set in Portland; the Stumptown Comics Fest, an annual comic book convention held in Portland; Stumptown Syndicate, a Portland-based 501(c)(3) organization working to create resilient, radically inclusive tech and maker communities that empower positive change; Stumptown Dance, a Portland based weekly Swing Dance; and Stumptown Mattress, a Portland based e-commerce mattress brand. 
Stumptown, Indiana is an unincorporated community in Parke County.
Stumptown, Loudoun County, Virginia is an unincorporated community.
Stumptown, Northampton County, Virginia is an unincorporated community.
Stumptown, West Virginia is an unincorporated community in Gilmer County.

References

Nicknames